The 3M6 Shmel is an MCLOS wire-guided Anti-tank missile of the Soviet Union. Its GRAU designation is "3M6" and its NATO reporting name is AT-1 Snapper.

Too large to be manportable, it was typically deployed from specialised vehicles or helicopters. The missile was intended to supplement traditional anti-tank weapons, like the 100 mm anti-tank gun whose accuracy beyond 1,500 m is poor. The missile's accuracy in contrast remained high as far as its maximum range of 2,000 m.

However, the system's bulk, slow speed and poor combat accuracy drove development of later SACLOS systems, like the AT-5 Spandrel.

Development
The 3M6 Shmel was based on the western ATGMs of the time, such as the Nord Aviation SS.10; however, it is considerably larger. It was developed by the Special Mortar Design Bureau (SKB Gladkostvolnoi Artillery) in Kolomna, who were also responsible for the AT-3 Sagger.

Development of the missile proceeded rapidly, with the first unguided flights in April 1958 followed by controlled flights in June and July 1958. On 28 August 1959, the new technology was shown to the command of armed forces. On 1 August 1960, it was accepted into the service. It was first publicly displayed in 1963.

History

There were two ground-based platforms for the missile
 2P26 Based on the unarmored GAZ-69 light truck - with four backward pointing launch rails. The control station can be deployed up to 30 m away from the launcher vehicle. It entered service in 1960
 2P27 Based on the armored BRDM-1 - with three pop up launch rails protected by an armored cover. It entered service in 1964.
These vehicles were deployed in anti-tank batteries attached to motor rifle regiments. Each battery has three platoons, each with three launch vehicles and a single command BRDM.

While a few were used by Egyptian forces during the 1967 Six-Day War and from 1969 in the War of Attrition, only one tank loss was attributed to the system. The system's hit probability is estimated to have been 25% in combat.

The system was also used by the Cypriot National Guard during the 1974 Turkish Invasion of Cyprus in a man-portable version. Several dozen shots were fired in action during a number of July and August engagements in the conflict, with low effectiveness.

North Korea began producing a reverse-engineered version of the missile in 1975.

Description
The missile is guided to the target by means of a joystick, which requires some skill on the part of the operator. The operator's adjustments are transmitted to the missile via a thin wire that trails behind the missile.

The missile is steered by an unconventional arrangement of vibrating spoilers.

As stated before, MCLOS requires considerable skill on the part of the operator. The system's effectiveness in combat drove the development of missiles based on the easier to use SACLOS system.

One problem with the missile is the amount of time it takes to reach maximum range—around 20 seconds—giving the intended target time to take action, either by retreating behind an obstacle, laying down a smoke screen or firing on the operator. Also, the large size of the missile means that only a few rounds can be carried; the BRDM-1 vehicle can only carry three missiles.

Operators

Current operators

Former operators
 
 
  - Seen combat.
 
 
 
 
 
  - 500

Captured operators
  - Captured units from Egypt and Syria.

General characteristics
 Length: 1150 mm
 Wingspan: 750 mm
 Diameter: 136 mm
 Launch weight: 22.5 kg
 Speed: 90 to 110 m/s
 Range: 500 m to 2.3 km
 Time to maximum range: 20 seconds
 Guidance: wire-guided MCLOS
 Warhead: 5.4 kg HEAT 300 mm vs RHA

References

 Hull, A.W., Markov, D.R., Zaloga, S.J. (1999). Soviet/Russian Armor and Artillery Design Practices 1945 to Present. Darlington Productions. .
 Jane's Weapon Systems 1977
 ПТУР первого поколения в АОИ in Russian

External links

 Gaz-69 Snapper - NATO codename for Gaz-69 fitted with Shmel ATGM (2P26 vehicle with 3M6 missiles of the Shmel ATGM system) – Walk around photos
 AT-1 SNAPPER

Anti-tank guided missiles of the Cold War
Anti-tank guided missiles of the Soviet Union
Military equipment introduced in the 1960s